This is a list of viceroys in Saint Lucia from the first French settlement in 1650, until the island gained independence from the United Kingdom in 1979.   Saint Lucia was colonized by the British and French in the 17th century and was the subject of several possession changes until 1814, when it was ceded to the British by France for the final time. In 1958, St. Lucia joined the short-lived semi-autonomous West Indies Federation. Saint Lucia was an associated state of the United Kingdom from 1967 to 1979 and then gained full independence on February 22, 1979.

Timeline of Saint Lucia

Governors of the colony of Sainte Lucie, 1651–1802

Governors of the British colony of Saint Lucia 1803–1834 
 General Robert Brereton 1803–1807, Commandant
 General Alexander Wood 1807–1814, Commandant
 Major Jacob Jordan 1814 (acting)
 General Francis Delaval 1814–1815, Commandant
 General Edward Stehelin 1815–1816, Commandant
 General Robert Douglas, Commandant 1816
 General Richard Augustus Seymour 1816–1817, Governor
 Colonel Edward O'Hara 1817–1818
 General Sir John Keane 1818–1819, Governor
 Major John Joseph Winkler 1819–1821 (acting Governor)
 General John Montagu Mainwaring 1821–1824, Governor
 Colonel Nathaniel Shepherd Blackwell 1824–1826
 General John Montagu Mainwaring 1826–1827, Governor
 Colonel Lorenzo Moore 1827–1829
 General David Stewart 1829, Governor
 Captain G.A.E. Delboate 1829 (acting Governor)
 Captain Robert Mullen 1829 (acting Governor)
 Major Francis Power 1829–1830 (acting Governor)
 James Alexander Farquharson 1830–1831, Governor
 George Mackie 1831, Governor
 Mark Anthony Bozon 1831–1832
 Colonel John Carter 1832 (acting Governor)
 James Alexander Farquharson 1832–1834 (second time)

Lieutenant-Governors of Saint Lucia, 1834–1857

Administrators of Saint Lucia 1857–1889

Commissioners of Saint Lucia 1889–1958 

 Robert Baxter Llewelyn 1889–1891
 Valesius Skipton Gouldsbury 1891–1896
 Charles Anthony King-Harman 1896–1899
 Sir Harry Langhorne Thompson 1900–1902
 Sir George Melville 1902–1905
 Philip Clark Cork 1905–1909
 Sir Edward John Cameron 1909–1914
 William Douglas Young 1914–1915
 Gideon Oliphant-Murray 1915–1918
 Wilfred Bennett Davidson-Houston 1918–1927
 Charles William Doorly 1927–1935
 Edward William Baynes 1935–1938
 Arthur Alban Wright 1938–1944
 Edward Francis Twining 1944–1946
 John Montague Stow 1947–1953
 John Kingsmill Thorp 1953–1958

Administrators of Saint Lucia 1958–1967 

After incorporation into the Federation of the West Indies:
 Julian Asquith, 2nd Earl of Oxford and Asquith 1958–1962
 Gerald Jackson Bryan 1962–1967

Governors of Saint Lucia 1967–1979 
On 27 February 1967, Saint Lucia became an associated state of the United Kingdom, responsible for its own internal affairs.  Sir Frederick Joseph Clarke was the first native Saint Lucian governor.

 Sir Frederick Joseph Clarke 1967–1973, Governor
 Sir Ira Marcus Simmons 1973–1974, Governor
 Sir Allen Lewis 1974–1979, Governor

On 22 February 1979, Saint Lucia achieved independence from the United Kingdom.  For a list of viceroys in Saint Lucia after independence, see Governor-General of Saint Lucia.

See also

References 

History of British Saint Lucia
Saint Lucia
Government of Saint Lucia
 Governros of British Saint Lucia
 Governros of French Saint Lucia